Omiodes is a moth genus in the family Crambidae (which is sometimes included in the Pyralidae). Several species are endemic to Hawaii.

Species
Omiodes accepta (Butler, 1877)
Omiodes albicilialis (Schaus, 1912)
Omiodes albicinctalis (Hampson, 1904)
Omiodes alboanalis Amsel, 1956
Omiodes albociliata (Moore, 1888)
Omiodes analis Snellen, 1880
Omiodes anastrepta Meyrick, 1899
Omiodes anastreptoidis Swezey, 1913
Omiodes annubilata (Swinhoe, 1894)
Omiodes antidoxa Meyrick, 1904
Omiodes anxiferalis (Schaus, 1912)
Omiodes argentigulalis (Schaus, 1912)
Omiodes asaphombra Meyrick, 1899 – ʻohe hedyleptan moth
Omiodes barcalis (Walker, 1859)
Omiodes basalticalis (Lederer, 1863)
Omiodes blackburni (Butler, 1877) – coconut leafroller
Omiodes camphorae (Tams, 1928)
Omiodes capillalis (Guenée, 1854)
Omiodes chloromochla (Meyrick, 1936)
Omiodes chrysampyx (Turner, 1908)
Omiodes collinsi Whalley, 1962
Omiodes confusalis (Dognin, 1905)
Omiodes continuatalis (Wallengren, 1860)
Omiodes contubernalis (Moore, 1888)
Omiodes croceiceps (Walker, 1866)
Omiodes cuniculalis Guenée, 1854
Omiodes dairalis (Walker, 1859)
Omiodes decisalis (Walker, 1866)
Omiodes demaratalis (Walker, 1859) – Hawaiian grass leafroller
Omiodes diemenalis (Guenée, 1854)
Omiodes dispilotalis (Walker, 1866)
Omiodes epicentra Meyrick, 1899 – Oahu swamp hedyleptan moth
Omiodes euryprora Meyrick, 1899 – Olaʻa banana hedyleptan moth
Omiodes fuliginalis (Walker, 1866)
Omiodes fullawayi Swezey, 1913 – Fullaway's banana hedyleptan moth
Omiodes fulvicauda (Hampson, 1898)
Omiodes fuscipennis (Swinhoe, 1894)
Omiodes giffardi Swezey, 1921
Omiodes grandis (Druce, 1902)
Omiodes granulata (Warren, 1896)
Omiodes hallwachsae Gentili & Solis, 1998
Omiodes humeralis Guenée, 1854
Omiodes hypoxantha (Dognin, 1904)
Omiodes indicata (Fabricius, 1775)
Omiodes indistincta (Warren, 1892)
Omiodes insolutalis Möschler, 1890
Omiodes iridias Meyrick, 1899
Omiodes janzeni Gentili & Solis, 1998
Omiodes laysanensis Swezey, 1914 – Laysan hedyleptan moth
Omiodes lentalis (C. Felder, R. Felder & Rogenhofer, 1875)
Omiodes leucostrepta Meyrick, 1886
Omiodes localis (Butler, 1879)
Omiodes longipennis (Warren, 1896)
Omiodes maia (Swezey, 1909)
Omiodes marmarca (Ghesquière, 1942)
Omiodes martini Amsel, 1956
Omiodes martyralis (Lederer, 1863)
Omiodes metricalis (Möschler, 1881)
Omiodes meyricki (Swinhoe, 1907)
Omiodes meyrickii Swezey, 1907 – Meyrick's banana hedyleptan moth
Omiodes monogona Meyrick, 1888
Omiodes monogramma Meyrick, 1899
Omiodes mostella (Dyar, 1912)
Omiodes musicola Swezey, 1909 – Maui banana hedyleptan moth
Omiodes nigriscripta Warren, 1896
Omiodes niphoessa (Ghesquière, 1942)
Omiodes nipponalis Yamanaka, 2005
Omiodes nitida (Hampson, 1912)
Omiodes noctescens (Moore, 1888)
Omiodes ochracea Gentili & Solis, 1998
Omiodes oconnori Tams, 1935
Omiodes odontosticta (Hampson, 1899)
Omiodes origoalis (Walker, 1859)
Omiodes ovenalis Swinhoe, 1906
Omiodes pandaralis (Walker, 1859)
Omiodes pernitescens (Swinhoe, 1894)
Omiodes poeonalis (Walker, 1859)
Omiodes poliochroa (Hampson, 1917)
Omiodes pritchardii Swezey, 1948
Omiodes pseudocuniculalis Gentili & Solis, 2000
Omiodes pyraustalis (Strand, 1918)
Omiodes rufescens (Hampson, 1912)
Omiodes salebrialis (Snellen, 1880)
Omiodes sauterialis (Strand, 1918)
Omiodes scotaea (Hampson, 1912)
Omiodes seminitidalis (Schaus, 1912)
Omiodes simialis Guenée, 1854
Omiodes similis (Moore, 1885)
Omiodes sirena Gentili & Solis, 1998
Omiodes spoliatalis (Lederer, 1863)
Omiodes stigmosalis (Warren, 1892)
Omiodes surrectalis (Walker, 1866)
Omiodes telegrapha Meyrick, 1899 – telegraphic hedyleptan moth
Omiodes tristrialis (Bremer, 1864)
Omiodes trizonalis (E. Hering, 1901)
Omiodes xanthodysana (Dyar, 1914)
Omiodes maculicostalis (Hampson, 1893)

Former species
Omiodes imbecilis (Moore, 1888)
Omiodes palliventralis Snellen, 1890

References

 Solis, M.A. & Gentili, P. (2000). Journal of the Lepidopterists' Society. 54 (2): 72–75.

 
Spilomelinae
Taxonomy articles created by Polbot
Crambidae genera
Taxa named by Achille Guenée